Těmice is a municipality and village in Pelhřimov District in the Vysočina Region of the Czech Republic. It has about 400 inhabitants.

Administrative parts
Villages of Babín, Drahoňov, Dráchov, Knížata and Nový Drahoňov are administrative parts of Těmice.

References

Villages in Pelhřimov District